The 19th Toronto Film Critics Association Awards, honoring the best in film for 2015, were awarded on December 14, 2015.

Winners

References

2015
2015 film awards
2015 in Toronto
2015 in Canadian cinema